Andy Manson is a luthier who has been hand-crafting guitars for over four decades. He has also crafted mandolins and multi-necked instruments. He is based in England, and is known for his crafting of flat-top, acoustic-guitars. He has influenced pieces by Hugh's & Brook Guitars, Adrian Lucas, Elysian Acoustics and Gary Nava.

History
Manson studied at the London College of Furniture, completing a course based on the production of stringed-instruments. Such course of which was non-existent at the time - the college itself eventually encouraged Manson to create his own course tailored specifically to luthiering. Constructing his first instrument in 1967, Manson started a workshop dedicated to the process shortly after in 1969 in Sussex, UK.

In the early 1980s, Manson was joined by his brother, fellow luthier Hugh Manson, who focused on the production of electric/bass-guitars. The pair opened a shop together in Devon, England in 1985.

Notable works
In 1974, Manson crafted an instrument for John Paul Jones of Led Zeppelin. The instrument featured three necks: a six-string, twelve-string and mandolin. The instrument can be found featured within Led Zeppelin's acoustic sets throughout the mid to late 70's. The production of said instrument can be found detailed in Manson's book Talking Wood. 

In 1994, Manson was commissioned to make another triple-neck guitar for Jimmy Page which was implemented during the Unledded performances.

Notable clients
Jimmy Page and John Paul Jones of Led Zeppelin
Ian Anderson of Jethro Tull
Andy Summers of The Police
Mark Chadwick of the Levellers

References

Guitar makers
Inventors of musical instruments
Woodworking
Living people
Year of birth missing (living people)